Komagata Maru Budge Budge railway station is a Kolkata Suburban Railway Station on the Budge Budge Branch line. It is under the jurisdiction of the Sealdah railway division in the Eastern Railway zone of the Indian Railways. It serves the local area of Budge Budge in South 24 Parganas district in the Indian state of West Bengal.

History

In 2013 the Budge Budge station was renamed as Komagata Maru Budge Budge station to commemorate the martyrs of the Komagata Maru incident who fell to British bullets near the station.

Electrification

Station complex
The platform is very much well sheltered. The station possesses many facilities including water and sanitation. There is a proper approach road to this station.

References

Railway stations in South 24 Parganas district
Sealdah railway division
Kolkata Suburban Railway stations
Railway stations in India opened in 1890
1890 establishments in the British Empire